Indraprastha (lit. "Plain of Indra" or "City of Indra") is mentioned in ancient Indian literature as a city of the Kuru Kingdom. It was the capital of the kingdom led by the Pandavas mentioned in Mahabharata . Under the Pali form of its name, Indapatta, it is also mentioned in Buddhist texts as the capital of the Kuru mahajanapada. Modern historical research pin its location in the region of present-day New Delhi, particularly the Old Fort (Purana Qila). The city is sometimes also known as Khandavaprastha or Khandava Forest, the name of a forest region on the banks of Yamuna river which (according to the Mahabharata) had been cleared by Krishna and Arjuna to build the city.

History
Indraprastha is referenced in the Mahabharata, a Sanskrit Indian text compiled over a period approximately between 400 BCE and 400 CE. It was one of the five places demanded for the sake of peace and to avert a disastrous war, Krishna proposed that if Hastinapur agreed to give the Pandavas only five villages, namely, Indraprastha, Swarnprastha (Sonipat), Panprastha (Panipat), Vyaghrprastha (Baghpat) and Tilprastha (Tilpat) then they would be satisfied and would make no more demands. Duryodhana vehemently refused, commenting that he would not part with land even as much as the point of a needle. Thus, the stage was set for the great war for which the epic of Mahabharata is known most of all. The Mahabharata records Indraprastha as being home to the Pandavas, whose wars with the Kauravas it describes.

During the Mauryan period, Indraprastha was known as Indapatta in Buddhist literature. The location of Indraprastha is uncertain but Purana Qila in present-day New Delhi is frequently cited. and has been noted as such in texts as old as the 14th-century CE. The modern form of the name, Inderpat, continued to be applied to the Purana Qila area into the early 20th century; in a study of ancient Indian place-names, Michael Witzel considers this to be one of many places from the Sanskrit Epics whose names have been retained into modern times, such as Kaushambi/Kosam.

Location
Purana Qila is certainly an ancient settlement but archaeological studies performed there since the 1950s have failed to reveal structures and artefacts that would confirm the architectural grandeur and rich lives in the period that the Mahabharata describes. The historian Upinder Singh notes that despite the academic debate, "Ultimately, there is no way of conclusively proving or disproving whether the Pandavas or Kauravas ever lived ...". However, it is possible that the main part of the ancient city has not been reached by excavations so far, but rather falls under the unexcavated area extending directly to the south of Purana Qila. Overall, Delhi has been the center of the area where the ancient city has historically been estimated to be. Until 1913, a village called Indrapat existed within the fort walls. As of 2014, the Archaeological Survey of India is continuing excavation in Purana Qila.

Historical Significance
Indraprastha is not only known from the Mahabharata. It is also mentioned as "Indapatta" or "Indapattana" in Pali-language Buddhist texts, where it is described as the capital of the Kuru Kingdom, situated on the Yamuna River. The Buddhist literature also mentions Hatthinipura (Hastinapura) and several smaller towns and villages of the Kuru kingdom. Indraprastha may have been known to the Greco-Roman world as well: it is thought to be mentioned in Ptolemy's Geography dating from the 2nd century CE as the city "Indabara", possibly derived from the Prakrit form "Indabatta", and which was probably in the vicinity of Delhi. Upinder Singh (2004) describes this equation of Indabara with Indraprastha as "plausible". Indraprastha is also named as a pratigana (district) of the Delhi region in a Sanskrit inscription dated to 1327 CE, discovered in Raisina area of New Delhi.

D. C. Sircar, an epigraphist, believed Indraprastha was a significant city in the Mauryan period, based on analysis of a stone carving found in the Delhi area at Sriniwaspuri which records the reign of the Mauryan emperor Ashoka. Singh has cast doubt on this interpretation because the inscription does not actually refer to Indraprastha and although "... a place of importance must certainly have been located in the vicinity of the rock edict, exactly which one it was and what it was known as, is uncertain." Similarly, remains, such as an iron pillar, that have been associated with Ashoka are not indubitably so: their composition is atypical and the inscriptions are vague.

See also 
Swarnprastha
Ashokan Edicts in Delhi
Hastinapura
History of Delhi
Historicity of the Mahabharata

References
Notes

Citations

Locations in Hindu mythology
Places in the Mahabharata
Ancient Indian cities
Former capital cities in India
History of Delhi